The Spanish Tercera División 1999–00 started on August 1999 and ended in June 2000 with the promotion play-off finals.

Grupo I

Grupo II

Grupo III

Grupo IV

Grupo V

Grupo VI

Grupo VII

Grupo VIII

Grupo IX

Grupo X

Grupo XI

Grupo XII

Grupo XIII

Grupo XIV

Grupo XV

Grupo XVI

Grupo XVII

Promotion play-offs
Source:

Notes

 
1998-99
4
Spain